These are the official results of the Men's 400 metres event at the 1987 IAAF World Championships in Rome, Italy. There were a total number of 48 participating athletes, with six qualifying heats and the final held on Thursday 1987-09-03.

Medalists

Records
Existing records at the start of the event.

Final

Semifinals
Held on Sunday 1987-09-01

Quarterfinals
Held on Saturday 1987-08-31

Qualifying heats
Held on Saturday 1987-08-30

References
 Results

 
400 metres at the World Athletics Championships